Port Huron station is an Amtrak station in Port Huron, Michigan, and the eastern terminus of the . The current station opened in 1979. It sits six blocks west of the St. Clair Tunnel, but the passenger tracks now terminate here and only freight tracks bypass the station and continue to Canada. Port Huron is the division point between the Flint Subdivision to Battle Creek, Michigan, and the Strathroy Subdivision to London, Ontario.

The station was formerly served by the International Limited, which was operated jointly by Via Rail and Amtrak between Chicago and Toronto. The service, which had started in 1982, was discontinued in 2004. The Port Huron station had contained  a United States Immigration Office while it served the International Limited.

References

External links

Port Huron Amtrak Station (USA Rail Guide—Train Web)
Port Huron, MI (PTH) (Amtrak's Great American Stations)

See also
History of railroads in Michigan

Amtrak stations in Michigan
Port Huron, Michigan
Buildings and structures in St. Clair County, Michigan
Transportation in St. Clair County, Michigan
Railway stations in the United States opened in 1979